Lu Jingjing (born 5 May 1989) is a Chinese tennis player.

Jingjing has won one WTA doubles title, and four singles and 14 doubles titles on the ITF Women's Circuit. On 15 January 2018, she reached her best singles ranking of world No. 159. On 21 September 2009, she peaked at No. 105 in the WTA doubles rankings.

WTA career finals

Doubles: 3 (1 title, 2 runner-ups)

WTA 125 tournament finals

Doubles: 1 (1 title)

ITF Circuit finals

Singles: 10 (4 titles, 6 runner-ups)

Doubles: 25 (14 titles, 13 runner-ups)

Ranking history

References

External links
 
 
 

Chinese female tennis players
Tennis players from Inner Mongolia
1989 births
Living people
21st-century Chinese women